John Charles Brophy (October 8, 1901December 26, 1976) was a U.S. Representative from Wisconsin.

Brophy was born in Eagle, Wisconsin. He graduated from St. Patrick's School in Milwaukee and attended Marquette Academy for a year. He enlisted in the Navy, serving from August 1919 to May 1921, when he was honorably discharged. Brophy was a Milwaukee alderman from 1939 until 1946, when was elected as a Republican to the 80th Congress, representing Wisconsin's 4th congressional district. Brophy remained in the House for a single term, being defeated by Clement Zablocki in 1948. He ran again, unsuccessfully, in 1950 and then retired from public service.

Brophy spent the rest of his life in Milwaukee, and died in 1976. He is buried in the Mount Olivet cemetery in Milwaukee.

Notes

External links

1901 births
1976 deaths
Milwaukee Common Council members
Politicians from Milwaukee
People from Eagle, Wisconsin
Republican Party members of the United States House of Representatives from Wisconsin
20th-century American politicians
Marquette University High School alumni